= David Ullman (author) =

American author

David Gordon Ullman
- Born: March 15, 1944 (age 82); Washington, D.C., United States
- Education: The Ohio State University
- Occupations: Author, professor, product design specialist
- Employer: Oregon State University
- Known for: The Mechanical Design Process
- Notable work: The Mechanical Design Process
- Awards: Life Fellow of the American Society of Mechanical Engineers (ASME)

David Gordon Ullman (born March 15, 1944, in Washington, D.C.) is an American author, professor, and a specialist on product design and decision making best practices. Ullman is best known for his textbook The Mechanical Design Process, used by universities globally. To date, Ullman's work has been cited more than 7,000 times with 2,000 citations. Ullman has a PhD in mechanical engineering from The Ohio State University and was professor of mechanical design at Oregon State University for 20 years. He is a Life Fellow of the American Society of Mechanical Engineers (ASME) and founder of its Design Theory and Methodology committee.

== Publications ==
=== Books ===
- The Mechanical Design Process, McGraw-Hill, NY, 6th Edition.
- Concurrent Engineering: The Product Development Environment for the 1990s, Mentor Graphics, 1991.
- "Mechanical Design Failure Analysis : D. G. Ullman : 9780824775346". www.bookdepository.com.
- Ullman, David G. (21 March 2019). Scrum for Hardware Design: Supporting Material for The Mechanical Design. David Ullman LLC. ISBN 978-0999357842.

=== Journals and papers ===
- Ullman, David (1995). "Taxonomy for classifying engineering decision problems and support systems". Artificial Intelligence for Engineering Design, Analysis and Manufacturing. 9 (5): 427–438. doi:10.1017/S0890060400002742. ISSN 1469-1760. S2CID 14381708.
- Ullman, David G.; D' Ambrosio, Bruce (1995). "Taxonomy for classifying engineering decision problems and support systems". Artificial Intelligence for Engineering Design, Analysis and Manufacturing. 9 (5): 427–438. doi:10.1017/S0890060400002742. ISSN 0890-0604. S2CID 14381708.
- Herling, Derald E. "An Engineering Decision Support System (EDSS) with alternative-criterion pair evaluations". ir.library.oregonstate.edu.
- Monteiro, M. R.; Lees, B.; Branki, C. (1998), "A Review of Engineering Design Support Systems and models", in Jacucci, Gianni; Olling, Gustav J.; Preiss, Kenneth; Wozny, Michael J. (eds.), Globalization of Manufacturing in the Digital Communications Era of the 21st Century: Innovation, Agility, and the Virtual Enterprise, IFIP - The International Federation for Information Processing, Boston, MA: Springer US, pp. 857–868, doi:10.1007/978-0-387-35351-7_67, ISBN 978-0-387-35351-7
- Nagy, Richard L.; Ullman, David G.; Dietterich, Thomas G. (1996), "A Data Representation for Collaborative Mechanical Design", in Waldron, Manjula B.; Waldron, Kenneth J. (eds.), Mechanical Design: Theory and Methodology, New York, NY: Springer, pp. 237–253, doi:10.1007/978-1-4757-2561-2_11, ISBN 978-1-4757-2561-2
- McGinnis, B. D.; Ullman, D. G. (1992-03-01). "The Evolution of Commitments in the Design of a Component". Journal of Mechanical Design. 114 (1): 1–7. doi:10.1115/1.2916917. ISSN 1050-0472.
- Ullman, D. (1992). "A taxonomy for mechanical design". Research in Engineering Design. 3 (3): 179–189. doi:10.1007/BF01580519. S2CID 111291051.
- Stauffer, Larry A.; Ullman, David G. (1991-01-01). "Fundamental Processes of Mechanical Designers Based on Empirical Data". Journal of Engineering Design. 2 (2): 113–125. doi:10.1080/09544829108901675. ISSN 0954-4828.
- Kuffner, Tom A.; Ullman, David G. (1991-01-01). "The information requests of mechanical design engineers". Design Studies. 12 (1): 42–50. doi:10.1016/0142-694X(91)90007-J. ISSN 0142-694X.
- Hwang, T. S.; Ullman, David G. (1990-01-01). "The Design Capture System: Capturing Back-of-the-envelope Sketches". Journal of Engineering Design. 1 (4): 339–353. doi:10.1080/09544829008901662. ISSN 0954-4828.
- "The Importance of Drawing". web.engr.oregonstate.edu.
- "A Model of the Mechanical Design Process". web.engr.oregonstate.edu.
- Stauffer, L. A.; Ullman, D. G. (1988-04-01). "A comparison of the results of empirical studies into the mechanical design process". Design Studies. 9 (2): 107–114. doi:10.1016/0142-694X(88)90036-1. ISSN 0142-694X.
- Ullman, D.G., T.G. Dietterich, "Toward Expert CAD," ASME, Computers in Mechanical Engineering ," Vol. 6, No. 3, Nov.-Dec. 1987, pp. 56–70
